Gorodskoy is a rural locality (a khutor) in Dzhidzhikhablskoye Rural Settlement of Teuchezhsky District, the Republic of Adygea, Russia. The population was 297 as of 2018. There are 7 streets.

Geography 
Gorodskoy is located 16 km north of Ponezhukay (the district's administrative centre) by road. Kunchukokhabl is the nearest rural locality.

Ethnicity 
The khutor is inhabited by Russians, Ukrainians and Adygheans.

References 

Rural localities in Teuchezhsky District